Henry H. "Gaffney" Smith Sr. (1904 – July 30, 1986) was an American football player and coach. He served as the head football coach at Campbell Junior College—now known as Campbell University—in Buies Creek, North Carolina from 1935 to 1939. Smith was a star athlete at his alma mater, Furman University. He was a three-time letter winner at tackle.  Gaffney died at the age of 82, on July 30, 1986, at Baptist Medical Center in Columbia, South Carolina.

References

External links
 

1904 births
1986 deaths
American football tackles
Campbell Fighting Camels football coaches
Furman Paladins football players
Junior college football coaches in the United States
People from Gaffney, South Carolina
Players of American football from South Carolina